Stanisław Zenon Zakrzewski (1890–1976) was a Polish sailing activist. He was a co-founder of the Club of Polish Seascapists (Klub Marynistów Polskich), vice-captain of the Yacht Club of Poland (Yacht Klub Polski). Zakrzewski was an author of the first Polish post-World War II yachting handbook Druh wiatr.

References

External links
 History of the Yacht Club of Poland

1890 births
1976 deaths
Polish non-fiction writers
Polish male non-fiction writers
Polish sailors